The 2016 FIBA World Olympic Qualifying Tournament in Belgrade was one of three 2016 FIBA World Olympic Qualifying Tournaments for Men. The tournament was held at the Kombank Arena in Belgrade, Serbia, from 4 to 9 July 2016. The winner qualified for the 2016 Summer Olympics.

Teams

Venue
The Kombank Arena was chosen as the main venue for the tournament. The arena's location is in New Belgrade, but the host city will be designated as "Belgrade", since it is one of the city municipalities of the Serbian capital. The arena hosted the EuroBasket 2005.

Referees
The following referees were selected for the tournament.

 Michael Weiland
 Joseph Bissang
 Carmelo Paternico
 Samir Abaakil
 Fernando Rocha
 Daniel Hierrezuelo
 Emin Moğulkoç 
 Anthony Jordan

Preliminary round
All times are local (UTC+2).

Group A

Group B

Knockout phase

Semifinals

Final

Final rankings

Statistical leaders

Players

Points

Rebounds

Assists

Steals

Blocks

Other statistical leaders

Teams

Points

Rebounds

Assists

Steals

Blocks

Other statistical leaders

Broadcasting
Below are the broadcasters of the participating teams

Sponsors

See also
 2016 Serbia OQT basketball team
2016 FIBA World Olympic Qualifying Tournaments for Men
2016 FIBA World Olympic Qualifying Tournament – Manila
2016 FIBA World Olympic Qualifying Tournament – Turin

Notes

References

External links
Official website

Belgrade
2016–17 in Serbian basketball
2016–17 in Angolan basketball
2016–17 in Czech basketball
2016–17 in Latvian basketball
2016 in Japanese sport
2016 in Puerto Rican sports
International basketball competitions hosted by Serbia
International sports competitions in Belgrade
July 2016 sports events in Europe
2010s in Belgrade